Salma is an Indian musical romance film directed by Ramanand Sagar which was released in 1985. It stars Raj Babbar, Salma Agha, Farooq Shaikh, And Shoma Anand in the lead roles.

Plot 
In this movie Competition of two friends for affection of a singer.

Cast 
 Raj Babbar as Nawabzada Aslam / Raj Lakhnauvi
 Salma Agha as Salma Banarasi
 Farooq Shaikh as Iqbal
 Shoma Anand as Mumtaz
 Pradeep Kumar as Nawab Bakar Ali
 Sushma Seth as Mrs. Bakar Ali
 Sujit Kumar as Akbar Mirza
 Prema Narayan as Courtesan
 Chandrashekhar as Thakur Balwant Singh
 Iftekhar as Ustadji

Soundtracks

References

External links 
 

1985 films
Films directed by Ramanand Sagar
Indian romantic musical films
1980s Urdu-language films
1980s romantic musical films
Urdu-language Indian films